The 1997 Direct Line International Championships was a tennis tournament played on grass courts at the Devonshire Park Lawn Tennis Club in Eastbourne in the United Kingdom that was part of Tier II of the 1997 WTA Tour. The tournament was held from 17 June until 22 June 1997.

Finals

Singles

 Arantxa Sánchez Vicario vs.  Jana Novotná

Doubles

 Lori McNeil /  Helena Suková vs.  Nicole Arendt /  Manon Bollegraf
 Both the women's singles and doubles finals were cancelled due to rain.

Notes

External links
 ITF tournament edition details

Direct Line International Championships
Eastbourne International
1997 in English women's sport
June 1997 sports events in the United Kingdom